Abram Efremovich Budanov (sometimes, Abraham; 1886–1929) was a Ukrainian anarchist military commander, as a member of the Makhnovist movement in Donbas and a permanent member of the RIAU Revolutionary Military Council.

Biography
Born in 1882 in the village of Stary Krym, in Mariupol, he also received four classes here.

He joined the anarcho-communists in 1905, took part in the Revolution of 1905–1907 in Luhansk. In 1917–1918, he was involved in organizing anarcho-syndicalist trade unions among Donbas miners, then he participated in the underground struggle against the Ukrainian State of Hetman Pavlo Skoropadsky.

In the spring of 1919 he joined the Makhnovist movement. In August 1919, he organized and led the Makhnovist uprising in units of the red 58th Division. On September 1, 1919, Abram was elected to the revolutionary military council of the RIAU in the village of Dobrovelichkovka.

In the RIAU he commanded the 1st Don Brigade, which was later transformed into a corps (1919), led the partisan struggle in Kharkov and Donetsk provinces (1920) and was a member of the Council of Revolutionary Insurgents of Ukraine.

On the evening of February 23, 1920, he arrived with the Makhnovists in Gavrilovka, Budanov called a meeting in the village and pasted leaflets with his own hand. At the end of March 17–18, in the village of Bolshaya Yanisol, he conducted political and propaganda work. In Aleksandrovka, Budanov was elected to the cultural and educational department on May 29, appointing him head of the department.

On September 29, 1920, the RIAU Council Diplomatic Commission was formed, which went to Kharkov to maintain contact with the Soviet government; Budanov was elected a member of the diplomatic mission.

He was arrested upon breaking the military-political agreement with the Bolshevik authorities on November 26, 1920, but in the summer of 1921 he escaped from the Ryazan prison and returned to Ukraine, leading the rebel movement until it was defeated in 1922 in Donbas.

By the end of 1928, he organized an underground anarchist group near Mariupol, which was discovered by the GPU of the Ukrainian SSR in November 25, 1928, and Budanov was sentenced to be shot.

In 1995 he was posthumously rehabilitated.

References

Bibliography
 

1886 births
1929 deaths
Makhnovshchina
People executed by the Soviet Union by firearm
People from Mariupol
Ukrainian anarchists
Executed anarchists